Polyacrylonitrile (PAN), also known as polyvinyl cyanide and Creslan 61, is a synthetic, semicrystalline organic polymer resin, with the linear formula (C3H3N)n. Though it is thermoplastic, it does not melt under normal conditions. It degrades before melting. It melts above 300 °C if the heating rates are 50 degrees per minute or above. Almost all PAN resins are copolymers made from mixtures of monomers with acrylonitrile as the main monomer.  It is a versatile polymer used to produce large variety of products including ultra filtration membranes, hollow fibers for reverse osmosis, fibers for textiles, and oxidized PAN fibers. PAN fibers are the chemical precursor of very high-quality carbon fiber.  PAN is first thermally oxidized in air at 230 °C to form an oxidized PAN fiber and then carbonized above 1000 °C in inert atmosphere to make carbon fibers found in a variety of both high-tech and common daily applications such as civil and military aircraft primary and secondary structures, missiles, solid propellant rocket motors, pressure vessels, fishing rods, tennis rackets and bicycle frames. It is a component repeat unit in several important copolymers, such as styrene-acrylonitrile (SAN) and acrylonitrile butadiene styrene (ABS) plastic.

History
Polyacrylonitrile (PAN) was first synthesized in 1930 by Hans Fikentscher and Claus Heuck in the Ludwigshafen works of the German chemical conglomerate IG Farben. However, as PAN is non-fusible, and did not dissolve in any of the industrial solvents being used at the time, further research into the material was halted. In 1931, Herbert Rein, head of polymer fiber chemistry at the Bitterfeld plant of IG Farben, obtained a sample of PAN while visiting the Ludwigshafen works. He found that pyridinium benzylchloride, an ionic liquid,  would dissolve PAN. He spun the first fibers based on PAN in 1938, using aqueous solutions of quaternary ammonium sodium thiocyanate and aluminum perchlorate for the production process and considered other solvents including DMF. However, commercial introduction was delayed due to the wartime stresses on infrastructure, inability to melt the polymer without degradation, and solvents to allow solution processing were not known yet.
The first mass production run of PAN fiber was in 1946 by American chemical conglomerate DuPont. The German intellectual property had been stolen in Operation Paperclip. The product, branded as Orlon, was based on a patent filed exactly seven days after a nearly identical German claim.  In the German Democratic Republic (GDR), industrial polyacrylonitrile fibre production was started in 1956 at the VEB Film- und Chemiefaserwerk Agfa Wolfen due to the preliminary work of the "Wolcrylon" collective (:de:Max Duch, Herbert Lehnert et al.). Prior to this, the preconditions for the production of the raw materials had been created at the Buna Werke Schkopau (Polyacrylonitrile) and Leuna works (Dimethylformamide). In the same year, the collective was awarded the GDR's National Prize II Class for Science and Technology for its achievements.

Physical properties 
Glass transition temperature is around 95 °C and fusion temperature is at 322 °C. PAN is soluble in polar solvents, such as dimethylformamide, dimethylacetamide, ethylene and propylene carbonates, and in aqueous solutions of sodium thiocyanate, zinc chloride or nitric acid. Solubility parameters: 26.09 MPa1/2 (25 °C) are 25.6 to 31.5 J1/2 cm−3/2. Dielectric constants: 5.5 (1 kHz, 25 °C), 4.2 (1 MHz, 25 °C).Can behave as branched as well as linear polymer.

Synthesis
Most commercial methods for the synthesis of PAN are based on free radical polymerization of acrylonitrile. In most of the cases, small amounts of other vinyl comonomers are also used (1–10%) along with AN depending on the final application. Anionic polymerization also can be used for synthesizing PAN. For textile applications, molecular weight in the range of 40,000 to 70,000 is used. For producing carbon fiber higher molecular weight is desired.

In the production of carbon fibers containing 600 tex (6k) PAN tow, the linear density of filaments is 0.12 tex and the filament diameter is 11.6 µm which produces a carbon fiber that has the filament strength of 417 kgf/mm2 and binder content of 38.6%. This data is demonstrated in the Indexes for Experimental Batches of PAN Precursor and Carbon Fibers Made from It table.

Applications
Homopolymers of polyacrylonitrile have been used as fibers in hot gas filtration systems, outdoor awnings, sails for yachts, and fiber-reinforced concrete. Copolymers containing polyacrylonitrile are often used as fibers to make knitted clothing like socks and sweaters, as well as outdoor products like tents and similar items. If the label of a piece of clothing says "acrylic", then it is made out of some copolymer of polyacrylonitrile.  It was made into the spun fiber at DuPont in 1942 and marketed under the name of Orlon. Acrylonitrile is commonly employed as a comonomer with styrene, e.g. acrylonitrile, styrene and acrylate plastics. Labelling of items of clothing with acrylic (see acrylic fiber) means the polymer consists of at least 85% acrylonitrile as the monomer. A typical comonomer is vinyl acetate, which can be solution-spun readily to obtain fibers that soften enough to allow penetration by dyes. The advantages of the use of these acrylics are that they are low-cost compared to natural fiber, they offer better sunlight resistance and have superior resistance to attack by moths. 
Acrylics modified with halogen-containing comonomers are classified as modacrylics, which by definition contain more than PAN percentages between 35-85%. Incorporation of halogen groups increases the flame resistance of the fiber, which makes modacrylics suitable for the use in sleepwear, tents and blankets. However, the disadvantage of these products is that they are costly and can shrink after drying.

PAN absorbs many metal ions and aids the application of absorption materials.  Polymers containing amidoxime groups can be used for the treatment of metals because of the polymers’ complex-forming capabilities with metal ions.

PAN has properties involving low density, thermal stability, high strength and modulus of elasticity. These unique properties have made PAN an essential polymer in high tech.

Its high tensile strength and tensile modulus are established by fiber sizing, coatings, production processes, and PAN's fiber chemistry.  Its mechanical properties derived are important in composite structures for military and commercial aircraft.

Carbon fiber
Polyacrylonitrile is used as the precursor for 90% of carbon fiber production.  Approximately 20–25% of Boeing and Airbus wide-body airframes are carbon fibers. However, applications are limited by PAN's high price of around $15/lb.

Glassy carbon
Glassy carbon, a common electrode material in electrochemistry, is created by heat-treating blocks of polyacrylonitrile under pressure at 1000 to 3000 °C over a period of several days. The process removes non-carbon atoms and creates a conjugated double bond structure with excellent conductivity.

Oxidized polyacrylonitrile fiber (OPF) 
Oxidized PAN Fiber is used to produce inherently flame resistant (FR) fabrics.  Commonly when it is used in FR fabrics for protective apparel it is referred to as OPF (oxidized polyacrylonitrile fiber) and is a high-performance, cost-effective flame and heat resistance solution.  OPF can be considered one of the most FR fabrics commercially produced since it has an LOI (Limiting Oxygen Index) in the range of 45–55% which is one of the highest LOI ranges available as compared with other common FR fabrics which have lower LOI values (e.g. Nomex @ 28–30%, Kevlar @ 28–30%, Modacrylic @ 32–34%, PBI @ 41%, and FR-Viscose @ 28%); and OPF also demonstrates the lowest toxic gas generation upon burning as compared with other common fabrics (e.g. Nomex, FR Polyester, and Cotton).

Support polymer
Polyacrylonitrile finds use as a porous supporting polymer for adsorbents for a variety of applications including ion exchange for cleaning up nuclear wastes. The PAN in this case is dissolved in a polar solvent such as DMSO along with the desired adsorbent and a surfactant and then dropped into water where it is crashed out and forms beads suitable for column use.

Tholins
Polyacrylonitrile is used in experiments as a precursor to tholin, a reddish-orange mixture of various organic compounds formed through radiolysis of carbon and nitrogen compounds. Naturally occurring tholins are expected to contain polyacrylonitrile and related heteropolymers containing some amino groups.

References

External links
 Polyacrylonitrile at Polymer Science Learning Center
 Polyacrylonitrile air filter Stanford engineers develop new air filter that could help Beijing residents breathe easily

Acrylate polymers
Copolymers
Synthetic resins
Synthetic fibers
Thermoplastics